General Material Designation (GMD) is used in Library and other catalogues to describe the material type of the item.The list was created as part of the Anglo-American Cataloging Rules (AACR2), and has been included  the International Standard Bibliographic Description, As part of the ongoing process to standardize international and local cataloging standards. While being superseded by the Resource Description and Access (RDA) rules, the GMD is still in use in many institutions. 
General Material Designation created a list of standardized terms, describing the material of the item. Examples such as braille, microfilm, motion picture are used to eliminate different cataloging practices previously used by Libraries. The full list appears in AACR2, with explanations and examples.
The GMD can be applied at different points in the catalog, according to MARCstandards. Points of access include title, alternative titles, author and subject.
In recent years, a number of issues regarding GMD have arisen, including lack of terms to define newer material types, lack of consistency in application by different library systems, incompatibility with needs of special libraries and museums, and the difficulty of relating to digital forms. In 2013 GMD was superseded by RDA, which greatly enlarged the list and divided the list into three, describing content, media and carrier types.

 

Library cataloging and classification